Mel Hankinson (born January 10, 1943) is an American former basketball coach and author.  He served as the head men's basketball coach at Slippery Rock University of Pennsylvania (1970–1973), Roanoke College (1973–1977), Delta State University (1977–1983), Samford University (1985–1987), The Master's College—now known as The Master's University (1988–1993), and Liberty University (1998–2002).  Hankinson has written a number of books and starred in videos on techniques for coaching basketball.

Hankinson spent over three decades coaching at the collegiate level.  He came to his highest profile position as head coach on April 8, 1998 at Liberty University after three years as the top assistant at West Virginia University.

Hankinson began his collegiate career as a head coach at Slippery Rock University, where he spent three seasons highlighted by capturing the Pennsylvania State Athletic Conference (PSAC) Western Division title in 1972.  For that season he was named NAIA District 18 Coach of the Year.  Then the following year, Hankinson led the Rockets to the NAIA National Semifinals where the school recorded a fourth-place finish. He holds a master's degree from Indiana State University

Playing career
Hankinson was a star player at Indiana State College—now known as Indiana University of Pennsylvania.  The 59 points he scored on February 26, 1965 against Parsons still stands as a school and Pennsylvania State Athletic Conference record today.

Books by Hankinson
Progressions for Teaching Basketball—Mel Hankinson, Cleveland, MS (1979)  
Basketball Basketball Basketball Co-Authored by Margaret Wade—Delta State University, Cleveland, MS (1980)  
Bench Coaching - Offensive Strategy—Championship Books, Ames, IA (1983) 60 pgs. 
How to Teach Match-Up Zone—Educational Products Publishing Co. (1986) 68 pgs.
Motivation—S.N. (1987) 24 pgs.
Bench Coaching - Defensive Strategy—Championship Books, Ames, IA (1993) 131 pgs.  
The Numbered Motion Offense—Championship Books, Ames, IA (1993) 110 pgs.

Head coaching record

References

1943 births
Living people
American men's basketball coaches
American men's basketball players
American non-fiction writers
Basketball coaches from Pennsylvania
Basketball players from Pennsylvania
Delta State Statesmen basketball coaches
IUP Crimson Hawks men's basketball players
Liberty Flames basketball coaches
Roanoke Maroons men's basketball coaches
Samford Bulldogs men's basketball coaches
Slippery Rock men's basketball coaches
The Master's Mustangs men's basketball coaches
West Virginia Mountaineers men's basketball coaches
Guards (basketball)